Gertrud Gabl (26 August 1948 – 18 January 1976) was an alpine skier from Austria. She competed in several events at the 1968 and 1972 Olympics with the best result of 9th place in the giant slalom in 1968.

Her best season was 1968/69, when she won the Alpine skiing World Cup. Her uncle Franz Gabl was also an Olympic alpine skier.

In the 1968 Winter Olympics she was 9th in the giant slalom and 12th in the downhill; she didn't finish the slalom.
In the FIS Alpine Skiing World Championships 1970 she was 4th in the slalom and 5th in the giant slalom.

In the World Cup she scored her first world cup points on 19 January 1967, when she finished fifth in the slalom at Schruns. Later she went on to win five slaloms and two giant slaloms. 

Her father Josef was also an excellent ski racer. 

She won the Overall Alpine Skiing World Cup in 1969, the same year as Karl Schranz did it for the men. Both of them came from the same village, St. Anton am Arlberg, ant that is the only time that the women's and men's overall champions hailed from the same village.

Death
On 18 January 1976 Gabl was skiing with two friends on the northern slope of Mount Gamberg at the ski resort of St. Anton am Arlberg in Austria, when an avalanche buried the three, and she was killed.  Her two companions were rescued alive.

World Cup results

Season titles
2 titles – (1 overall, 1 slalom)

Season standings

Race victories
7 wins – (5 SL, 2 GS)
17 podiums – (10 SL, 7 GS)

World Championship results

Olympic results

References

External links

 

1948 births
1976 deaths
FIS Alpine Ski World Cup champions
Alpine skiers at the 1968 Winter Olympics
Alpine skiers at the 1972 Winter Olympics
Olympic alpine skiers of Austria
Austrian female alpine skiers
Deaths in avalanches
Natural disaster deaths in Austria
Sportspeople from Tyrol (state)
20th-century Austrian women